Unjha railway station is a railway station in Mahesana district, Gujarat, India on the Western line of the Western railway network. Passenger, Express, and Superfast trains halt here.

Nearby Stations

Kamli is the nearest railway station towards , whereas Unawa Aithor is the nearest railway station towards .

Major Trains

The following Express and Superfast trains halt at Unjha railway station in both directions:

 14805/06 Yesvantpur - Barmer AC Express
 14803/04 Bhagat Ki Kothi - Ahmedabad Weekly Express
 12989/90 Dadar - Ajmer Superfast Express
 22473/74 Bandra Terminus - Bikaner Superfast Express
 22931/32 Bandra Terminus - Jaisalmer Superfast Express
 12915/16 Ahmedabad - New Delhi Ashram Superfast Express
 19565/66 Okha - Dehradun Uttaranchal Express
 19707/08 Bandra Terminus - Jaipur Amrapur Aravali Express
 19413/14 Ahmedabad - Kolkata Sare Jahan Se Accha Express
 19411/12 Ahmedabad - Ajmer Intercity Express
 19031/32 Ahmedabad - Haridwar Yoga Express
 19223/24 Ahmedabad - Jammu Tawi Express

References 

Railway stations in Mahesana district
Ahmedabad railway division